Alwyne Jan Calinao Perez (born 20 April 1981) is a Filipino blogger and motivational speaker who gained prominence as a blogger when his article, "Dear Ex ni Janine Tugonon" ("Dear Janine Tugonon's Ex (Boyfriend)") went viral. He is known for his humorous, fearless and witty writing style and his works are often about politics, current events, love and relationships, and life advice.

He is currently residing in Davao City where he spends majority of his time giving retreats and corporate seminars. He has also served as a consultant to various educational institutions. He is the 2013 Globe Tatt Pilipinas "Blogger Phenom" of the year for Davao City.

He is also a guest lecturer teaching social science subjects to pre-dentistry students from the Davao Medical School Foundation Inc (DMSFI).

Education 
Perez went to the University of the Philippines Manila (UPM) where he studied in the Organizational Communication program. Prior to his stay in UPM, he earned some units in Philosophy while briefly staying in a seminary that is run by the Rogationist Fathers in Parañaque.

Blogging 
Perez first gained prominence as a blogger when his article,"Dear Ex ni Janine Tugonon" went viral. This article was his humorous take regarding the relationship woes of Miss Universe 2012 first runner-up Janine Tugonon and her boyfriend Jaypee Santos. In just the span of two days, the article spread nationwide attention having 120,000 readers and was re-posted to various social networking sites such as Facebook and Twitter and gained traction from there as well. This viral post was even posted by the Philippines' major TV networks, ABS-CBN and GMA Network.

A month later, Perez again made the news when his blog post, "Dear Kuyang Taiwanese" ("Dear Taiwanese Elder Brother") went viral over social media sites. This article was Perez' way to defend Filipino migrant workers who were abused in Taiwan as a result of the standoff between the two countries over a territorial dispute.

During the Social Media Day celebrations in the Philippines, Globe Telecom awarded Perez to be the first Globe Tatt Pilipinas Awards "Blogger Phenom" for Davao City.

His article "Because I Fell in Love Here in Davao" written as his homage for Davao City in time for the Kadayawan 2013 celebrations garnered much-acclaim from Davaoeños as the article went viral through social media. Also, during the height of the Priority Development Assistance Fund scam in the Philippines, many of Perez' articles that poked fun on those involved in the scam went viral on social media as well.

References

External links 
 AJ Perez:Mga Kuwentong Istirero
 "Letter to Johnnie Walker." A Letter Writer.com

1981 births
Filipino bloggers
Filipino writers
People from Parañaque
People from Davao City
Filipino Roman Catholics
Living people
University of the Philippines Manila alumni
Filipino motivational speakers